A pelican is a bird of the family Pelecanidae.

Pelican may also refer to:

Places

Australia
Pelican, New South Wales, a suburb of the city of Lake Macquarie
Pelican, Queensland, a locality
Pelican Lagoon, South Australia
Pelican Lagoon Conservation Park
Pelican Point (Swan River), Western Australia

Canada
Pelican, Ontario, an unincorporated community and railway point

United States
Pelican, Alaska, a city
Pelican State Beach, California
Pelican, Louisiana, an unincorporated community
Pelican Township, Crow Wing County, Minnesota
Pelican Township, Otter Tail County, Minnesota
Pelican Butte, a dormant volcano in Oregon
Pelican, Wisconsin, a town

Natural formations
Pelican Creek (disambiguation)
Pelican River (disambiguation)

Ships
 , many British Royal Navy ships
 , several United States Navy ships
 , a United States Bureau of Fisheries research vessel in service from 1930 to 1940 which then served in the Fish and Wildlife Service fleet as the fishery patrol vessel US FWS Pelican from 1940 to 1958
  or Pelican, Sir Francis Drake's ship
 , a British privateer which sank in 1793
 , a short-lived ship that won the Battle of Hudson's Bay
 , a replica of Pélican built in Quebec and moored at Donaldsonville, Louisiana
 , delivered pioneer women and yellow fever to Mobile in 1704
 , an oceanographic research vessel
 , a fishing boat which capsized in 1951 off Montauk, New York
 Pelican (dinghy), a small sail boat class in Perth, Australia
 , formerly Pelican (1948), sail training ship
 Pelican (Bill Short), one of a series of boats designed by Captain Bill Short
 , operated by the Hudson's Bay Company from 1901–1920, see Hudson's Bay Company vessels

Aviation
Boeing Pelican, a large-capacity, low-altitude transport aircraft currently being studied
Sikorsky HH-3F Pelican, a US Coast Guard search and rescue helicopter
Doman LZ-2A Pelican, a five-seat helicopter first flown in 1949
Pilatus SB-2, a Swiss civil utility aircraft
Ultravia Pelican, two series of ultralight aircraft
Air Est JCD 03 Pelican, a motor glider
Pelican (bomb), a World War II radar-guided bomb developed by the U.S. Navy
Pelican Air Services, South African airline
Pelican, callsign of Australian airline Aeropelican Air Services
Pelikan tail, a tail design created by Ralph Pelikan

Music
The Pelicans, Detroit doowop group produced by Al Benson in Chicago in 1953
Pelican (band), a post-metal band from Chicago
Pelican (EP), their self-titled EP
Pelican, an EP by Tracer AMC
"Pelican" (song), a 2011 song by The Maccabees
"Pelican", a 2015 song by David Guetta on the re-release of Listen

Print
Pelican (magazine), the University of Western Australia student newspaper
Pelican Books, a non-fiction imprint of Penguin Books
Pelican Publishing Company
Les Pelican, a 1921 novel by Raymond Radiguet

Sports
New Orleans Pelicans, a National Basketball Association team (formerly the Hornets)
St. Petersburg Pelicans, two defunct baseball teams
Myrtle Beach Pelicans, a minor league baseball team
New Iberia Pelicans, a defunct minor league baseball team
Pensacola Pelicans, a defunct minor league baseball team
Lahti Pelicans, a Finnish ice-hockey team in the national elite league Liiga
AS Pélican, a Gabonese football club
Pelican Stadium, a former stadium in New Orleans

Other uses
Pelican (Fabergé egg), a jewelled Easter egg
The Pelican (film), a 1973 French film
Pelican crossing, a type of pedestrian road crossing
Pelican (train), a train of the Southern Railway which ran between New York City to New Orleans
Pelican Nebula, an HII region located toward the constellation Cygnus
Pelican Products, a producer of cases and flashlights
RAAF Squadron Berlin Air Lift or Operation Pelican, the Australian contribution to the Berlin Air Lift
The Pelican, former name of the Prospect of Whitby pub in London

See also
Pelican Drop, a former New Year's Eve celebration in Pensacola, Florida
Pelican eel, a deep sea species of fish
Pelican Island (disambiguation)
Pelican Lake (disambiguation)
Pelican Portrait, of Elisabeth I of England
Pelican Point (disambiguation)
Pelicanman, a 2004 Finnish fantasy film
Pelikan (disambiguation)
The Pelican Brief, a legal-suspense thriller by John Grisham (1992)
The Pelican Brief (film), 1993